Global Unichip Corporation (GUC) is a worldwide fabless ASIC design service company, with its headquarters located in the Hsinchu Science Park in Hsinchu, Taiwan.

Overview 
Founded in 1998, GUC is a dedicated SoC (System On Chip) Design Foundry based in Taiwan.
TSMC invested in GUC in 2003 and became the largest shareholder.

Facilities 
 Headquarter in Hsinchu, Taiwan 
 Taipei, Taiwan
 Tainan, Taiwan
 San Jose, California, United States
 Yokohama, Japan
 Seoul, South Korea
 Amsterdam, Europe
 Shanghai, China
 Shenzhen, China
 Beijing, China
 Nanjing, China

Products 
 ASIC & wafers: Provide complete design, wafer manufacturing, packaging and testing services.
NRE (Non-Recurring Engineering): Provide circuit design cell library and various IPs required in the process of product design; provide circuit layouts needed for mask making; subcontract mask making, wafer manufacturing, dicing and packaging to vendors; conduct final testing to get prototype samples for customers. 
MPW (Multiple-Project Wafer): MPW integrates multiple design projects of different customers on one single mask and by one wafer engineer run. It is an effective and fast time-to-market chip verification service with cost-sharing in masking and wafer engineering run. Design engineers, before the phase of mass production, are able to timely verify their prototype designs with advanced process technologies and much lower costs.
IP (Intellectual Property): These are silicon-verified reusable IC designs with specific functions. With the rapid advancement of semiconductor processing technologies, the design industry is trending toward multi-functional chips and SoC (System on a Chip). GUC provides reusable IP help customers avoid redundant designs and resources.

See also
 List of companies of Taiwan

References

External links 
 GUC
Linkedin

1998 establishments in Taiwan
Taiwanese companies established in 1998
Companies based in Hsinchu
Fabless semiconductor companies
Semiconductor companies of Taiwan